Evelyn Amie "Evie" Pinching (18 March 1915 – 24 December 1988) was a British alpine skier who won the 1936 women's downhill and combined events in the world championship in Innsbruck, and competed in the 1936 Winter Olympics, where she finished ninth in the alpine skiing combined. In 1937 Pinching won the Hahnenkamm downhill in Kitzbühel. She was born in Norwich.

Evie Pinching Award 

The Evie Pinching Award is an annual prize organised by the Ski Club of Great Britain given to an athlete aged 24 or under considered 'one to watch' in their snowsports discipline.

The athletes are nominated by the sport’s UK national governing bodies, Snowsport England, Snowsport Scotland, Snowsport Wales, Disability Snowsport UK and British Ski and Snowboard - with a shortlist of then chosen by the Ski Club. This shortlist is then open to public vote. The winner receives a £1,000 bursary and training opportunities with elite athletes.

Past winners: Katie Ormerod - 2015, Menna Fitzpatrick - 2016, Thomas Gerken-Schofield - 2017.

References

External links
 Alpine skiing 1936 
 
 FIS database record

1915 births
1988 deaths
Sportspeople from Norwich
English female alpine skiers
Olympic alpine skiers of Great Britain
Alpine skiers at the 1936 Winter Olympics